Katra is a town and a nagar panchayat in Gonda district in the Indian state of Uttar Pradesh.

Geography
It has an average elevation of 111 metres (364 feet).

Demographics
 India census, Katra had a population of 6,430. Males constitute 51% of the population and females 49%. Katra has an average literacy rate of 40%, lower than the national average of 59.5%: male literacy is 49%, and female literacy is 31%. In Katra, 22% of the population is under 6 years of age.

References

Cities and towns in Gonda district